Zoltán Füredi (Budapest, Hungary, 21 May 1954) is a Hungarian mathematician, working in combinatorics, mainly in discrete geometry and extremal combinatorics. He was a student of Gyula O. H. Katona. He is a corresponding member of the Hungarian Academy of Sciences (2004). He is a research professor of the Rényi Mathematical Institute of the Hungarian Academy of Sciences, and a professor at the University of Illinois Urbana-Champaign (UIUC).

Füredi received his Candidate of Sciences degree in mathematics in 1981 from the Hungarian Academy of Sciences.

Some results
 In infinitely many cases he determined the maximum number of edges in a graph with no C4.
 With Paul Erdős he proved that for some c>1, there are cd points in d-dimensional space such that all triangles formed from those points are acute.
 With Imre Bárány he proved that no polynomial time algorithm determines the volume of convex bodies in dimension d within a multiplicative error dd.
 He proved that there are at most  unit distances in a convex n-gon.
 In a paper written with coauthors he solved the Hungarian lottery problem.
 With Ilona Palásti he found the best known lower bounds on the orchard-planting problem of finding sets of points with many 3-point lines.
 He proved an upper bound on the ratio between the fractional matching number and the matching number in a hypergraph.

References

External links
 Füredi's UIUC home page

20th-century Hungarian mathematicians
21st-century Hungarian mathematicians
Members of the Hungarian Academy of Sciences
Combinatorialists
University of Illinois Urbana-Champaign faculty
1954 births
Living people